Sree Narayana College, Punalur, is a general degree college located in Punalur, Kollam district, Kerala. SN COLLEGE PUNALUR

NAAC Reaccredited with B++ Grade (CGPA:2.91) Supported by the FIST programme of DST.

Sree Narayana College, Punalur is the center for higher education in the eastern alcove of Kollam district in Kerala. The institution was established by a veteran businessman P.V. Bhanu Panicker, in devout memory of Sree Narayana Guru, a saint, poet, philosopher and one of the greatest social reformers Kerala has ever produced. The college is managed by the Sree Narayana Trusts, Kollam, one of the leading educational agencies in the state. It is affiliated to the University of Kerala, and has 12 B recognition from the UGC and re accredited by NAAC with ‘B++’ Grade. The college is supported by the FIST Program of DST, Government of India.

The college was officially inaugurated on 15 July by Shri. R. Sankar, the then Chief Minister of Kerala. The first principal of the college was the noted social scientist Dr. P. Vijayaraghavan. Nestling in a verdant hillock of twenty-five acres, the college comes alive with the sound of hundreds of young men and women ascending their temple of learning and enlightment. Ever since its inception in 1965, Sree Narayana College, Punalur has catered to the educational and intellectual needs of the youth, uplifting the society in the eastern niche of Kollam district.

The college offers degree courses in Chemistry, Physics, Zoology, Mathematics, Commerce, Economics and History. A vocational course in B.A. Communicative English was introduced in 1998-99. At the Post-Graduate level, the college offers M.Sc. in Chemistry, Physics, Mathematics, MA History.

The college also conducts a myriad of short-term programmes and courses for the all-round development of the student’s personality. Various clubs and study centres function to encourage and nurture the aesthetic and literary talents of its members. A multi-gymnasium has been set up in the college for the development of physical prowess and sporting talents.

Conscious of its inceptual obligation, it takes education to the doorsteps of the poor and marginalized sections of the society and endeavours to mould a humane, intellectually progressive, morally awakened and socially committed group of young men and women.

Departments

Science

Physics
Chemistry
Mathematics
Zoology

Arts and Commerce

Oriental Language
English
History
Political Science
Economics
Physical Education
Commerce

Accreditation
The college is  recognized by the University Grants Commission (UGC).

Notable alumni
 K. N. Balagopal, Honorable Finance Minister of Kerala

References

External links
http://www.sncollegepunalur.in

Universities and colleges in Kollam district
Educational institutions established in 1965
1965 establishments in Kerala
Arts and Science colleges in Kerala
Colleges affiliated to the University of Kerala